A Craftsman's Legacy is an American television series.  The series host, Eric Gorges, tours the United States in search of those who take pride in a particular skill.  Each week an artisan of a particular crafts, such as creating horse saddles, is showcased.

The show initially debuted on public television in October 2014, and is distributed by APT.

References

External links 
 A Craftsman's Legacy Season1
 

PBS original programming
2014 American television series debuts